Aotearoa Mata'u (born 2 May 1997) is a New Zealand rugby union player. She made her international debut for New Zealand on 22 October 2016 against Australia in Auckland.

Mata'u was selected in the 28-player squad that played the Wallaroos in a two-test series in October 2016. She was also named in the Black Ferns squad for the 2017 World Cup in Ireland.

In 2018, Mata'u featured in a YouTube video that highlighted her fending off five defenders in a try-scoring run by the giant prop for her Portuguese club, Sporting.

References

External links 
 Aotearoa Mata'u at Black Ferns

1997 births
Living people
New Zealand female rugby union players
New Zealand women's international rugby union players